Buxin station is a Metro station of Shenzhen Metro Line 5. It opened on 22 June 2011.

Station layout

Exits

References

External links
 Shenzhen Metro Buxin Station (Chinese)
 Shenzhen Metro Buxin Station (English)

Shenzhen Metro stations
Railway stations in Guangdong
Luohu District
Railway stations in China opened in 2011